Miren León Ruiz (born 7 June 1975) is a Spanish former judoka who competed in the 2000 Summer Olympics.

References

Biography

Results

Miren Leon (Spain)

1975 births
Living people
Spanish female judoka
Olympic judoka of Spain
Judoka at the 2000 Summer Olympics